The following list includes notable people who were born or have lived in Champaign, Illinois. For a similar list organized alphabetically by last name, see the category page People from Champaign, Illinois.

Business, science, and engineering

Crime

Media and arts

Bands

Politics

Religion

Sports

References

Champaign
Champaign